Hannah Glasse (March 1708 – 1 September 1770) was an English cookery writer of the 18th century. Her first cookery book, The Art of Cookery Made Plain and Easy, published in 1747, became the best-selling recipe book that century. It was reprinted within its first year of publication, appeared in 20 editions in the 18th century, and continued to be published until well into the 19th century. She later wrote The Servants' Directory (1760) and The Compleat Confectioner, which was probably published in 1760; neither book was as commercially successful as her first.

Glasse was born in London to a Northumberland landowner and his mistress. After the relationship ended, Glasse was brought up in her father's family. When she was 16 she eloped with a 30-year-old Irish subaltern then on half-pay and lived in Essex, working on the estate of the Earls of Donegall. The couple struggled financially and, with the aim of raising money, Glasse wrote The Art of Cookery. She copied extensively from other cookery books, around a third of the recipes having been published elsewhere. Among her original recipes are the first known curry recipe written in English, as well as three recipes for pilau, an early reference to vanilla in English cuisine, the first recorded use of jelly in trifle, and an early recipe for ice cream. She was also the first to use the term "Yorkshire pudding" in print.

Glasse became a dressmaker in Covent Garden—where her clients included Princess Augusta, the Princess of Wales—but she ran up excessive debts. She was imprisoned for bankruptcy and was forced to sell the copyright of The Art of Cookery. Much of Glasse's later life is unrecorded; information about her identity was lost until uncovered in 1938 by the historian Madeleine Hope Dodds. Other authors plagiarised Glasse's writing and pirated copies became common, particularly in the United States. The Art of Cookery has been admired by English cooks in the second part of the 20th century, and influenced many of them, including Elizabeth David, Fanny Cradock and Clarissa Dickson Wright.

Biography

Early life

Glasse was born Hannah Allgood at Greville Street, Hatton Garden, London, to Isaac Allgood and his mistress, Hannah Reynolds. Isaac, a landowner and coal-mine owner, was from a well-known, respected family from Nunwick Hall, Hexham, Northumberland; he was married to Hannah  Clark, the daughter of Isaac of London, a vintner. Glasse was christened on 24 March 1708 at St Andrews, Holborn, London. Allgood and Reynolds had two other children, both of whom died young. Allgood and his wife also had a child, Lancelot, born three years after Glasse.

Allgood took Reynolds and the young Hannah back to Hexham to live, and she was brought up with his other children, but according to A. H. T. Robb-Smith in the Oxford Dictionary of National Biography, Reynolds was "banished from Hexham"; no reason is recorded. By 1713 Allgood and Reynolds were again living together back in London. The following year, while drunk, Allgood signed papers transferring all his property to Reynolds. Once he realised the magnitude of his mistake, the couple separated. The Allgood family tried to have the property returned, which they managed in 1740, providing Glasse with an annual income and a sum of capital. She did not have a good relationship with her mother, who had little input into her daughter's upbringing; Glasse described her in correspondence as a "wicked wretch!"

Soon after the death of his wife in 1724, Allgood fell ill and Glasse was sent to live with her grandmother. Although Glasse was banned from attending social events by her grandmother, she began a relationship with an older man: John Glasse. He was a 30-year-old Irish subaltern, then on half-pay, who had previously been employed by Lord Polwarth; John was a widower. On 4 August 1724 the couple were secretly married by special licence. Her family found out about the marriage a month later, when she moved out of her grandmother's house and in with her husband in Piccadilly. Although her family were angered by the relationship, they soon resumed cordial dealings, and continued a warm and friendly correspondence. Hannah's first letter to her grandmother apologised for the secrecy surrounding her elopement, but did not express regret for getting married. "I am sorry at what I have done, but only the manner of it".

By 1728 the Glasses were living in New Hall, Broomfield, Essex, the home of the 4th Earl of Donegall; John Glasse was probably working as an estate steward. They had their first child while living at New Hall. The Glasses moved back to London in November 1734 where they lodged for four years before moving to Greville Street, near Hatton Garden. Over the coming years Glasse gave birth to ten children, five of whom died young. She considered education important, and sent her daughters to good local schools and her sons to Eton and Westminster. The couple struggled constantly with finances, and in 1744 Glasse tried to sell Daffy's Elixir, a patent medicine; the project did not take off. She then decided to write a cookery book.

The Art of Cookery

In a letter dated January 1746 Glasse wrote "My book goes on very well and everybody is pleased with it, it is now in the press". The Art of Cookery Made Plain and Easy was printed the following year and sold at "Mrs. Ashburn's, a China Shop, the corner of Fleet-Ditch", according to the title page. The book was available bound for 5 shillings, or plainly stitched for 3 shillings. As was the practice for publishers at the time, Glasse provided the names of subscribers—those who had pre-paid for a copy—who were listed inside the work. The first edition listed 202 subscribers; that number increased for the second and third editions. On the title page Glasse writes that the book "far exceeds any Thing of the Kind ever yet published". In the introduction she states "I believe I have attempted a Branch of Cookery which Nobody has yet thought worth their while to write upon", which, she explains, is to write a book aimed at the domestic staff of a household. As such, she apologises to readers, "If I have not wrote in the high, polite Stile, I hope I shall be forgiven; for my Intention is to instruct the lower Sort, and therefore must treat them in their own Way".

Glasse extensively used other sources during the writing: of the 972 recipes in the first edition, 342 of them had been copied or adapted from other works. This plagiarism was typical of the time as, under the Statute of Anne—the 1709 act of parliament dealing with copyright protection—recipes were not safeguarded against copyright infringement. The chapter on cream was taken in full from Eliza Smith's 1727 work, The Compleat Housewife, and, in the meat section, 17 consecutive recipes were copied from The Whole Duty of a Woman, although Glasse had rewritten the scant instructions intended for experienced cooks into more complete instructions for the less proficient.

A second edition of The Art of Cookery Made Plain and Easy appeared before the year was out, and nine further versions were published by 1765. The early editions of the book did not reveal its authorship, using the vague cover "By a Lady"; it was not until the fourth imprint, published in 1751, that Glasse's name appeared on the title page. The absence of an author's name permitted the erroneous claim that it was written by John Hill; in James Boswell's Life of Johnson, Boswell recounts a dinner with Samuel Johnson and the publisher, Charles Dilly. Dilly stated that "Mrs. Glasse's Cookery, which is the best, was written by Dr Hill. Half the trade know this." Johnson was doubtful of the connection because of confusion in the book between saltpetre and sal prunella, a mistake Hill would not have made. Despite this, Johnson thought it was a male writer, and said "Women can spin very well; but they cannot make a good book of cookery".

Later years
The same year in which the first edition was published, John Glasse died. He was buried at St Mary's church, Broomfield, on 21 June 1747. That year, Glasse set herself up as a "habit maker" or dressmaker in Tavistock Street, Covent Garden, in partnership with her eldest daughter, Margaret. The fourth edition of her book included a full-page advertisement for her shop, which said she was the "habit maker to Her Royal Highness the Princess of Wales", Princess Augusta. When her half-brother Lancelot came to stay with her, he wrote:

Hannah has so many coaches at her door that, to judge from appearances, she must succeed in her business ... she has great visitors with her, no less than the Prince and Princess of Wales, to see her masquerade dresses.

Glasse was not successful in her line of business and, after borrowing heavily, she was declared bankrupt in May 1754 with debts of £10,000. Among the assets sold off to pay her debts was the copyright of The Art of Cookery Made Plain and Easy to Andrew Miller and a conger of booksellers, and 3,000 copies of the fifth edition; the syndicate held the rights for the next fifty years. It is not clear what subsequent involvement Glasse had in any of the printings after the fifth. She was issued with a certificate of conformity, which marked the end of her bankruptcy, in January 1755.

In 1754 the cookery book Professed Cookery: containing boiling, roasting, pastry, preserving, potting, pickling, made-wines, gellies, and part of confectionaries was published by Ann Cook. The book contained what was titled "an essay upon the lady's Art of Cookery", which was an attack on Glasse and The Art of Cookery, described by the historian Madeleine Hope Dodds as a "violent onslaught", and by the historian Gilly Lehman as "appalling doggerel". Dodds established that Cook had been in a feud with Lancelot Allgood and used the book to gain a measure of revenge against him.

Glasse continued to live at her Tavistock Street home until 1757, but her financial troubles continued and she was imprisoned as a debtor at Marshalsea gaol in June that year before being transferred to Fleet Prison a month later. By December she had been released and registered three shares in The Servants' Directory, a work she was writing on how to manage a household; it included several blank pages at the end for recording kitchen accounts. The work was published in 1760, but was not commercially successful. Glasse also wrote The Compleat Confectioner, which was published undated, but probably in 1760. As she had with her first book, Glasse plagiarised the work of others for this new work, particularly from Edwards Lambert's 1744 work The Art of Confectionery, but also from Smith's Compleat Housewife and The Family Magazine (1741). Glasse's work contained the essentials of sweet-, cake- and ices-making, including how to boil sugar to the required stages, making custards and syllabubs, preserving and distilled drinks.

There are no records that relate to Glasse's final ten years. In 1770 The Newcastle Courant announced "Last week died in London, Mrs Glasse, only sister to Sir Lancelot Allgood, of Nunwick, in Northumberland", referring to her death on 1 September.

Books
The Art of Cookery Made Plain and Easy consists mainly of English recipes, and is aimed at providing good, affordable food, and the television cook Clarissa Dickson Wright saw the work as "a masterly summary" of English cuisine of well-to-do households in the mid-18th century. Glasse saw that household education for young ladies no longer included confectionery and grand desserts, and many of the recipes in The Compleat Confectioner move away from the banqueting dishes of the 17th century to new style desserts of the 18th and 19th. In The Art of Cookery she shows signs of a modern approach to cooking with more focus on savoury dishes—which had a French influence—rather than the more prestigious but dated sweet dishes that had been favoured in the 17th century. In The Compleat Confectioner she writes:

every young lady ought to know both how to make all kind of confectionary, and dress out a desert; in former days, it was look'd on as a great perfection in a young lady to understand all these things, if it was only to give directions to her servants[.]

Glasse was not averse to criticising the French or their cooking, and her introduction states:

A Frenchman in his own country will dress a fine dinner of twenty dishes, and all genteel and pretty, for the expence he will put an English lord to for dressing one dish. ... I have heard of a cook that used six pounds of butter to fry twelve eggs; when every body knows ... that half a pound is full enough, or more than need be used: but then it would not be French. So much is the blind folly of this age, that they would rather be imposed on by a French booby, than give encouragement to a good English cook!

Despite Glasse's overtly hostile approach to French cuisine, there is, Stead detects, a "love-hate relationship with French cookery, scorn coupled with sneaking admiration". In The Art of Cookery, Glasse introduced a chapter of eight recipes—all detailed and intricate, and all French in origin—with the advice "Read this chapter and you will find how expensive a French cook's sauce is". The first recipe, "The French way of dressing partridges" ends with her comment "This dish I do not recommend; for I think it an odd jumble of trash ... but such receipts as this, is what you have in most books of cookery yet printed." Henry Notaker, in his history of cookery books, observes that Glasse has included what she sees to be a poor recipe, only because her readers would miss it otherwise. Throughout the book she introduced recipes that were French in origin, although these were often anglicised to remove the heavily flavoured sauces from meat dishes. With each new publication of the book, the number of non-English recipes rose, with additions from German, Dutch, Indian, Italian, West Indian and American cuisines.

The first edition introduced the first known English-written curry recipe, as well as three recipes for pilau; later versions included additional curry recipes and an Indian pickle. These—like most of her recipes—contained no measurements or weights of ingredients, although there are some practical directions, including "about as much thyme as will lie on a sixpence".

Glasse added not just a recipe for "Welch rabbit" (later sometimes called Welsh rarebit), but also "English Rabbit" and "Scotch Rabbit". The book includes a chapter "For Captains of the Sea"—containing recipes for curing and pickling food—and recipes for "A Certain Cure for the Bite of a Mad Dog" (copied from Richard Mead) and a "Receipt [recipe] against the Plague". The 1756 edition also contained an early reference to vanilla in English cuisine and the first recorded use of jelly in trifle; she called the trifle a "floating island". Later printings added hamburgers ("hamburgh sausages"), piccalilli ("Paco-Lilla" or "India Pickle") and an early recipe for ice cream. Glasse was the first to use the term "Yorkshire pudding" in print; the recipe had first appeared in the anonymously written 1737 work The Whole Duty of a Woman under the name "dripping pudding".

Anne Willan, in her examination of historical cooks and cookery books, suggests that although it is written in an easy style, The Art of Cookery Made Plain and Easy "can never have been an easy book to use", as there was no alphabetical index in the early editions, and the organisation was erratic in places. Although the early versions did not contain an index at the end of the book, they have what Wendy Hall describes in her study "Literacy and the Domestic Arts" as a "jaw-droppingly extensive table of contents that categorized the subject matter over the course of twenty-two pages".

According to the historian Caroline Lieffers, Glasse was part of an increased rationalisation in cookery; although she did not give timings for all her recipes there were more than authors of earlier cookery books had printed. She was also ahead of her time in other respects: she gave a recipe for "pocket soop" years before the introduction of branded stock cube; over a century before Louis Pasteur examined microbiology and sterilisation, Glasse advised cooks, when finishing pickles and jams, to "tye them close with a bladder and a leather" to aid preservation. She went to great lengths in her books to stress the need for cleanliness in the house, particularly in the kitchen, where dirty equipment will either mar the flavour or cause illness. Her advice reflects the trend of increasing hygiene in England at the time, with piped water more widely available. The food historian Jennifer Stead writes that many visitors to England reported that the servants were clean and well turned out.

In The Art of Cookery, Glasse departs from many of her predecessors and does not provide a section of medical advice—a pattern followed in 1769 by Elizabeth Raffald in The Experienced English Housekeeper—although chapter ten of The Art of Cookery is titled "Directions for the sick", and contains recipes for broth, dishes from boiled and minced meats, caudles, gruel and various drinks, including "artificial asses milk". Glasse also did not give instructions on how to run the household. In her preface, she writes:

I shall not take upon me to meddle in the physical Way farther than two Receipts which will be of Use to the Publick in general: One is for the Bite of a mad Dog; and the other, if a Man shoud be near where the Plague is, he shall be in no Danger; which, if made Use of, would be found of very great Service to those who go Abroad.
Nor shall I take it upon me to direct a Lady in the Oeconomy of her Family, for every Mistress does, or at least ought to know what is most proper to be done there; therefore I shall not fill my Book with a deal of Nonsense of that Kind, which I am very well assur'd none will have Regard to. 

Glasse aimed The Art of Cookery at a city-dwelling readership and, unlike many predecessors, there was no reference to "country gentlewomen" or the tradition of the hospitality of the gentry. The Servants' Directory was aimed solely at female members of staff, and each role undertaken by the female staff was examined and explained fully. The historian Una Robertson observes that "the torrent of instructions addressed to 'my little House-maid' must have severely confused that individual, had she been able to read".

Legacy

Information about Glasse's identity was lost for years. In 1938 Dodds confirmed the connection between her and the Allgood family in an article in Archaeologia Aeliana.

The Art of Cookery was the most popular cookery book of the 18th century and went through several reprints after Glasse's death. With over twenty reprints over a hundred years, the last edition was well into the 19th century. Glasse's work was plagiarised heavily throughout the rest of the 18th and 19th century, including in Isabella Beeton's bestselling Mrs Beeton's Book of Household Management (1861). The words "plain and easy" from the title were also used by several others. Copies of The Art of Cookery were taken to America by travellers, and it became one of the most popular cookery books in colonial America; it was printed in the US in 1805. It is possible that Benjamin Franklin had some of the recipes translated to French for his trip to Paris. Copies of The Servants' Directory were also extensively pirated in America.

The instruction "First catch your hare" is sometimes wrongly attributed to Glasse. The Oxford English Dictionary observes that the use is "(i.e. as the first step to cooking him): a direction jestingly ascribed to Mrs. Glasse's Cookery Book, but of much more recent origin". The mis-provenance is from the recipe for roast hare in The Art of Cookery, which begins "Take your hare when it be cas'd", meaning simply to take a skinned hare. The saying is one of around 400 of her quotations used in the Oxford English Dictionary.

In 1983 Prospect Books published a facsimile of the 1747 edition of The Art of Cookery under the title First Catch Your Hare, with introductory essays by Stead and the food historian Priscilla Bain, and a glossary by the food writer Alan Davidson; it has been reissued several times. When Stead was asked to contribute to the 1983 printing, she examined the 1747 publication and made what Davidson and the food writer Helen Saberi described as a "truly pioneering work", studying each recipe and tracing which of them were original or had been copied from other writers. It was Stead who established that Glasse had copied 342 of them from others. In 2006 Glasse was the subject of a BBC drama-documentary presented by the television cook Clarissa Dickson Wright; Dickson Wright described her subject as the "mother of the modern dinner party" and "the first domestic goddess". The 310th anniversary of Glasse's birth was the subject of a Google Doodle on 28 March 2018.

Glasse has been admired by several modern cooks and food writers. The 20th century cookery writer Elizabeth David considers that "it is plain to me that she is reporting at first hand, and sometimes with an original and charming turn of phrase"; the television cook Fanny Cradock provided a foreword to a reprint of The Art of Cookery in 1971, in which she praised Glasse and her approach. Craddock found the writing easy to follow and thought Glasse an honest cook, who seemed to have tried most of the recipes in the book. The food writer Jane Grigson admired Glasse's work, and in her 1974 book she included many of Glasse's recipes. Dickson Wright affirms that she has "a strong affinity for Hannah Glasse. I admire her straightforward, unpretentious approach to cookery." For Dickson Wright, "she is one of the greats of English food history."

Notes and references

Notes

References

Sources

Books

Journals

News

Internet

External links

  from the British Library (and biographical information)
 

English food writers
English non-fiction writers
Writers from Hexham
Writers from London
1708 births
1770 deaths
People imprisoned for debt
Inmates of the Marshalsea
Inmates of Fleet Prison
Women cookbook writers
18th-century English women writers
History of British cuisine